The 1996 FIVB World Grand Prix was the fourth women's volleyball tournament of its kind. It was held over four weeks in eight cities throughout Asia, cumulating with the final round in Shanghai, PR China, from 27 to 29 September 1996.

Preliminary rounds

Ranking
The host China and top three teams in the preliminary round advance to the Final round.

|}

First round

Group A
Venue: Sendai, Japan

|}

Group B
Venue: Jakarta, Indonesia

|}

Second round

Group C
Venue: Osaka, Japan

|}

Group D
Venue: Beijing, China

|}

Third round

Group E
Venue: Honolulu, United States

|}

Group F
Venue: Macau

|}

Fourth round

Group G
Venue: Taipei, Taiwan

|}

Group H
Venue: Hong Kong

|}

Final round
Venue: Shanghai, China

|}

Final ranking

|}

Final standings

Individual awards
Most Valuable Player:

Best Scorer:

Best Spiker:

Best Blocker:

Best Server:

Best Setter:

Best Receiver:

Dream Team

Setter:

Middle Blockers:

Outside Hitters:

Opposite Hitter:

References
Results

FIVB World Grand Prix
1996 in Chinese sport
International volleyball competitions hosted by China
1996